Kyne Santos, often mononymously billed as Kyne, is a Canadian drag queen best known for competing in the first season of Canada's Drag Race.

Early life
Santos was born in Manila in the Philippines. He is of Filipino descent. He moved to Kitchener, Canada with his parents when he was 5. He studied math at the University of Waterloo.

Career
Prior to competing in Canada's Drag Race, Kyne had a following on YouTube for drag enthusiasts with a series of tutorials on sewing and wig styling.

Although Kyne was eliminated from Canada's Drag Race in the second episode, and got the "villain edit" because his self-confidence was perceived by some viewers as lapsing into cockiness, he subsequently became a popular figure on social media, attracting over 800,000 followers on TikTok with a popular series of math tutorials presented in drag. The math videos have included straightforward presentations on general mathematical concepts such as pi and googol, math riddles and memes, and in-depth analysis of the use of mathematics in the news, such as demonstrating the numerical flaws in bad reporting on issues such as the COVID-19 pandemic and race-based crime statistics. For Fierté Montréal's special online edition of its annual Drag Superstars show, which featured all of the Canada's Drag Race queens in prerecorded video performances, Kyne performed an original math-themed rap parody of Will Smith's "Gettin' Jiggy wit It".

Santos has described his math tutorials as inspired by a desire to present math in a fun and entertaining way, and by a desire to break down barriers, including countering common stereotypes that LGBTQ people cannot succeed in maths and sciences, and presenting a counterexample to the widespread belief that people can be analytical or creative but not both.

In January 2021, Santos also shared his coming out story in a new video for the ongoing It Gets Better Project.

References

1998 births
Living people
21st-century Canadian LGBT people
Filipino drag queens
Canada's Drag Race contestants
Canadian drag queens
Canadian gay men
Canadian mathematicians
Canadian people of Filipino descent
Canadian TikTokers
Gay entertainers
LGBT TikTokers
University of Waterloo alumni